The Mindanao Examiner is an independent regional newspaper published and edited every week with general circulation in Mindanao, Philippines.

It is located at the Unit 15, 3F Fairland Bldg., Mayor Vitaliano Agan Avenue, Zamboanga City. It offers video productions and has a cable channel in Pagadian City in Zamboanga del Sur province (KISMET Cable TV).

External links
Official Mindanao Examiner website

Newspapers published in Mindanao
Mass media in Zamboanga City
Mindanao
Companies based in Zamboanga City
Publishing companies established in 2006
2006 establishments in the Philippines